The 1898 Brooklyn Bridegrooms suffered a huge loss on January 4 when team founder Charles Byrne died. Charles Ebbets became the new president of the team and moved them into the new Washington Park. The team struggled all season, finishing in a distant tenth place in the National League race.

Offseason 
 November 12, 1897: George Shoch and cash were traded by the Bridegrooms to the St. Louis Browns for Bill Hallman.
 March 5, 1898: Tommy Tucker was purchased by the Bridegrooms from the Washington Senators.

Regular season 

Billy Barnie was fired as manager in June with the team's record at 15–20 and the team mired in ninth place. Ebbets took over himself for a while before they handed the team over to Mike Griffin to finish the season. The results weren't much better, as the team immediately lost five out of their next six, with an overall 39–71 record after Barnie's departure.

Season standings

Record vs. opponents

Notable transactions 
 May 19, 1898: John Anderson was sent conditionally by the Bridegrooms to the Washington Senators.
 July 19, 1898: Tommy Tucker was purchased from the Bridegrooms by the St. Louis Browns.
 September 21, 1898: John Anderson was returned to the Bridegrooms by the Washington Senators.

Roster

Player stats

Batting

Starters by position 
Note: Pos = Position; G = Games played; AB = At bats; R = Runs; H = Hits; Avg. = Batting average; HR = Home runs; RBI = Runs batted in; SB = Stolen bases

Other batters 
Note: G = Games played; AB = At bats; R = Runs; H = Hits; Avg. = Batting average; HR = Home runs; RBI = Runs batted in; SB = Stolen bases

Pitching

Starting pitchers 
Note: G = Games pitched; GS = Games started; IP = Innings pitched; W = Wins; L = Losses; ERA = Earned run average; BB = Bases on balls; SO = Strikeouts; CG = Complete games

Other pitchers 
Note: G = Games pitched; GS = Games started; IP = Innings pitched; W = Wins; L = Losses; ERA = Earned run average; BB = Bases on balls; SO = Strikeouts; CG = Complete games

Relief pitchers 
Note: G = Games pitched; IP = Innings pitched; W = Wins; L = Losses; SV = Saves; ERA = Earned run average; BB = Bases on balls; SO = Strikeouts

Notes

References 
Baseball-Reference season page
Baseball Almanac season page

External links 
Brooklyn Dodgers reference site
Acme Dodgers page 
Retrosheet

Los Angeles Dodgers seasons
Brooklyn Superbas season
Brooklyn
19th century in Brooklyn
Park Slope